Saibai Bhonsale (née Nimbalkar) ( 1633 – 5 September 1659) was the first wife and chief consort of Shivaji, the founder of the Maratha Empire. She was the mother of her husband's successor Sambhaji.

Family

Saibai was a member of the prominent Nimbalkar family, whose members were the rulers of Phaltan from the era of the Pawar dynasty and served the Deccan sultanates and the Mughal Empire. She was a daughter of the fifteenth Raja of Phaltan, Mudhojirao Naik Nimbalkar, and a sister of the sixteenth Raja, Bajaji Rao Naik Nimbalkar. Saibai's mother Reubai was from the Shirke family. Ravali from Andhra Pradesh is the current last granddaughter of Shivaji and Saibai.

Marriage
Saibai and Shivaji  were married while still in their childhood on 16 May 1640 at Lal Mahal, Pune. The marriage was arranged by his mother,  Jijabai; but was evidently not attended by his father, Shahaji nor his brothers, Sambhaji and Ekoji. Thus, Shahaji soon summoned his new daughter-in-law, son, and his mother, Jijabai, to Bangalore, where he lived with his second wife, Tukabai. Shahaji  held a grand wedding ceremony at Bangalore.

Saibai and Shivaji shared a close relationship with each other. She is said to have been a wise woman and a loyal consort to him. By all accounts, Saibai was a beautiful, good-natured, and affectionate woman. She is described as having been a "gentle and selfless person."

All of her endearing personal qualities, however, were a sharp contrast to Shivaji‘s second wife, Soyarabai, who was an intriguing lady. She also had significant influence over her husband and the royal family as well. Saibai is reported to have acted as a counsel to Shivaji when he was invited by Mohammed Adil Shah, the king of Bijapur, for a personal interview. During Saibai's life time, the entire household of Shivaji bore a homogeneous atmosphere despite the fact that most of his marriages were performed due to political considerations.

After Saibai's untimely death in 1659 followed by Jijabai's death in 1674, Shivaji's private life became clouded with anxiety and unhappiness. Although Soyarabai had gained prominence in the royal household following their deaths, she was not an affectionate consort like Saibai, whom Shivaji had dearly loved.

Saibai remained Shivaji's favorite till he died. A great source of inspiration to him, legend has it that "Sai" was the last word he uttered on his deathbed.

Issue

During the course of their nineteen years of marriage, Saibai and Shivaji became parents of four children: Sakavarbai (nicknamed "Sakhubai"), Ranubai, Ambikabai, and Sambhaji. Sakhubai was married to her first-cousin, Mahadji, the son of Saibai's brother, Bajaji Rao Naik Nimbalkar. Ranubai married into the Jadhav family. Ambikabai married Harji Raje Mahadik in 1668. Saibai's fourth issue was her only son, Sambhaji, who was born in 1657 and was Shivaji's eldest son and thus, his heir-apparent. The birth of Sambhaji was an occasion of great joy and significance in the royal household for many different reasons.

Death

Saibai died in 1659 in Rajgad Fort while Shivaji Maharaj was making preparations for his meeting with Afzal Khan at Pratapgad. She was ill from the time she gave birth to Sambhaji and her illness became serious preceding her death. Sambhaji was taken care by her trustworthy Dhaarau. Sambhaji was two years old at the time of his mother's death and was brought up by his paternal grandmother, Jijabai. Saibai's samadhi is situated at Rajgad Fort.

In popular culture
Literature - Shivpatni Saibai, a biography of Saibai's life written by Dr. Sadashiv Shivade. 
Film- Umadevi Nadgonde, popularly known as Baby Shakuntala portrayed Saibai in the Marathi language 1955 film Chhatrapati Shivaji Maharaj 
Film- Smita Patil played Saibai in the 1974 film Raja Shiv Chhatrapati
Film - Isha Keskar played Maharani Saibai in the 2022 Film Sher Shivraj directed by Digpal Digpal Lanjekar
In Colors TV's 2012 historical drama, Veer Shivaji, Saibai was portrayed by an actress Palak Jain as a teenager and by Sonia Sharma as an adult.
Television- Rujuta Deshmmukh portrays Saibai in the popular TV series, Raja Shivchatrapati which aired on Star Pravah. 
Television- Poorva Gokhale played Saibai in Swarajyarakshak Sambhaji, based on the life of Sambhaji
Television- Saibai is portrayed by Samira Gujar-Joshi while Gargi Ranade plays the young Saibai in Swarajya Janani Jijamata based on the life of Jijabai

References

1633 births
1659 deaths
Indian female royalty
Women of the Maratha Empire
Indian queen consorts
Shivaji
17th-century Indian women
17th-century Indian people